China–Togo relations refer to the foreign relations between the People's Republic of China and Togo. They established diplomatic relations on September 19, 1972.

Economic ties

Chinese development finance to Togo
From 2000 to 2011, there are approximately 40 Chinese official development finance projects identified in Togo through various media reports. These projects range from road rehabilitation projects in 2009, to a 60 million Euro loan for Togo's Banque Ouest Africaine de Developpement in 2011, and an approximately $31.7 million loan to the state operator Togo Telecom from Chinese EXIM Bank.

Human Rights
In June 2020, Togo was one of 53 countries that backed the Hong Kong national security law at the United Nations.

See also
 Foreign relations of Togo

References

Togo
Bilateral relations of Togo
Togo